Irinej Bulović (born Mirko Bulović; 11 February 1947) is a Serbian Orthodox cleric and the current Bishop of Bačka. He serves as а professor of the New Testament exegesis and Greek language on the Faculty of Theology of the University of Belgrade.

Biography
Bulović was born as Mirko to parents Mihailo and Zorka on 11 February 1947, in Stanišić near Sombor in Serbia (then FPR Yugoslavia). He graduated from the Faculty of Theology in Belgrade in 1969. While a student, he took monastic vows from his mentor Justin Popović and then took monastic name of Irinej (Irenaeus). In 1969, Pavle, then bishop of Raška and Prizren (later Serbian Patriarch) ordained Bulović as hierodeacon and later hieromonk. For two years (1969–1970) he lived in the Ostrog Monastery where he was a teacher in the monastic school. He completed his post-graduate studies in 1970–1980 at the School of Theology of the University of Athens, Greece, where he gained the doctor of theology degree in June 1980. In 1981, he was appointed a professor of the New Testament exegesis on the Faculty of Theology in Belgrade, a position he still holds .

During the regular session of the Holy Synod of the Serbian Orthodox Church in 1989, Irinej Bulović was elected a Vicar Bishop of Moravica, and in 1990 he was elected Bishop of Bačka and enthroned in the Saint George's Cathedral in Novi Sad on 24 December 1990.

He repeatedly attends international ecumenical meetings and is recognized ecumenical worker.

When Patriarch Irinej fell ill, he was seen as one of the main candidates for position of the next patriarch.

References

|-

1947 births
Living people
People from Sombor
20th-century Eastern Orthodox bishops
21st-century Eastern Orthodox bishops
20th-century Serbian people
Bishops of Bačka
Philhellenes
University of Belgrade Faculty of Orthodox Theology alumni
Academic staff of the University of Belgrade
Serbian writers